Dewhirst is a surname, and may refer to:

 Edward Dewhirst (1815–1904), Australian minister and educationist
 Ian Dewhirst (born 1936), English historian and author
 Joan Dewhirst (born 1935), British figure skater 
 John Dawson Dewhirst (1952–c.1978), British teacher and yachtsman 
 James Dewhirst (born 1892, date of death unknown), English World War I flying ace
 Kym Winter-Dewhirst, Australian public servant